Mount Pleasant Square is a Georgian garden square on the border of Rathmines and Ranelagh, in the city of Dublin, Ireland. It is about a twenty-five minute walk from Grafton Street.

The Georgian houses surrounding the square were constructed from around the year 1770 and the last was completed around 1830. The square is notable for its elegance and quiet charm. In her article in The Georgian Squares of Dublin, Susan Roundtree writes: "It has justifiably been described as one of the most beautiful early 19th-century squares in Dublin." In the 24 March 1978 edition of In Dublin magazine, Gordon Lynch wrote, "The recently face-lifted Mount Pleasant Square, which is protected by a preservation order, is the only curved square in Dublin, if such a thing is possible."

There are 56 terraced houses on three sides of a central open space, now housing a tennis club and a small public park. The north and south sides are crescents rather than typical borders of a square. About half of the houses are occupied by young families, while several remain in apartments. Homes on the west side have south-west facing back gardens, there is a Victorian Era post-box on the south-west corner of the square, and 24-hour disc parking is enforced.

History 

Mount Pleasant Square is about 100 yards from where the Ranelagh Gardens once stood. The public park beside the LUAS station is all that remains of what were once far more extensive grounds. Richard Crosbie became the first Irish person to fly a balloon when he took off from the gardens in 1785. Crosbie wanted to cross the Irish Sea, but only made it to Clontarf.
After the Act of Union in 1801, middle-class professionals abandoned Georgian mansions on the northside, and moved to places with smaller, more manageable houses in new southside suburbs such as Rathmines and Ranelagh. As Susan Roundtree notes: “The first suburban boom accelerated during subsequent generations and established the pattern of city centre migration to the suburbs.”

According to a January 2015 article in the English Daily Telegraph, Mount Pleasant in London, which presumably inspired the usage in Dublin, "was the tongue-in-cheek name for the medieval dumping ground of household refuse, ashes, and other trash, along the banks of the woefully polluted Fleet River in Clerkenwell (before the river was buried underground). The street name remains, though the irony is lost."

Mount Pleasant Square was developed in the early 19th century, much of it by the Dolan family. Terence Dolan was a glove maker from Chester who bought plots of land from a Solomon Williams (also of Chester) in three transactions: in 1807, 1808 and 1812.

On the first plot of land – on the south side of what is now the square – Dolan built eight houses (Nos 36–43). At the time, these houses would have had commanding views of the city centre. A speculative developer, Dolan leased out the properties on short leases and raised the money to build more houses. By 1812 he had acquired all the land on the north and west sides of the square.

The second son of Terence Dolan, Terence Thomas Dolan, was a key mover behind the Rathmines Township, and was one of its first commissioners in 1847. By 1848 he effectively owned 32 of the houses on the square. His son, Henry Joseph Dolan, became President of Mount Pleasant Lawn Tennis Club in the centre of the square, when it was established in 1893.

The social composition of the houses has always been varied. In the past, many doctors and solicitors lived on the square, which is relatively close to Fitzwilliam Square and the Law Library. The square once housed two schools, and in 1911 the 14 inhabitants of No 27 included a carpenter, a scholar and a fishmonger. Of the 387 people who lived on the square that year, there were 149 Catholics, 177 Church of Ireland, 20 Presbyterian, 10 Methodist and 7 Baptists. An average of 7 people lived in each house.

Architecture 

Most of the houses are two-storey over basements that are below ground level. Many of the gardens have now been shortened to accommodate mews buildings. There is a lot of variation in individual house construction, as the plot sizes are not uniform.

Susan Roundtree notes that the houses were probably built by tradesmen rather than skilled craftsmen. Three bay houses were soon joined by smaller, two-bay houses that were effectively miniature versions of the city houses with two principal rooms on each floor. The basement walls are about two feet thick, with limestone calp used throughout. The windows were typical vertically sliding timber sashes.

Mount Pleasant Square is an example of rus in urbe, 'a countryside in the city'. The overall composition is more impressive than any one house. With its bucolic curtain of trees and handsome terraced Georgian houses, the atmosphere on this well-preserved square is often described as Dickensian, as if residents step into a period drama every time they leave the house. There is something elegant, if slightly bashful, about the whole effect: drooping trees, little traffic, gentle plop of tennis balls.

Public park 

The small public park beside the tennis club is unsatisfactory. It was the subject of a planning controversy in the 1970s. At one point it seemed inevitable that the thin sliver of land would be given over to a garage, but a well-orchestrated outcry ensured its survival as a public amenity.

The Dolan Family 
Terence Dolan was the main developer of Mountpleasant Square in the early 19th Century. His son, Terence T. Dolan, a solicitor, was one of the key motivators in establishing the Rathmines Township in 1847 and was one of its first commissioners. He lived at number 31, the largest house on the square, with an archway to Mountpleasant Avenue. The family retained property interests in the square well into the 20th Century.

Old Mount Pleasant 
The houses at Old Mountpleasant predate the houses in Mountpleasant Square. Among the early residents was Thomas Ivory, a Corkman who was one of the most important architects working in Dublin in the latter part of the 18th Century (and the only one of the three major architects of Georgian Dublin who was Irish). Ivory designed a number of significant surviving buildings in the city including the Blue Coat School (now the Law Society Headquarters in Blackhall Place) and Newcomen Bank in Castle Street (now the Rates Office). He was also Master of the Architectural Drawing School in Dublin. He died in 1786.

The Swan River 
The Swan River, although now hidden from view, defines the landscape and topography of Ranelagh. From its source near Kimmage Manor it flows through Rathmines and Ranelagh and joins the River Dodder below Ballsbridge. In Ranelagh it flows to the east through Mount Pleasant Square (where the arch leads out to Mount Pleasant Avenue) before crossing into Ranelagh Gardens.

Ranelagh Multi-Denominational School 
This RIAI Gold Medal award-winning school was designed by O'Donnell & Tuomey Architects and opened in 1998 (subsequently extended). It replaced the 'tin school', a hall built in 1893 (later a church). The new building is contemporary in design but its scale and finishes (salvaged brick and timber) are in sympathy with the adjoining historic buildings.

Local amenities 

Mount Pleasant Lawn Tennis Club has squash, badminton and tennis courts, as well as a table tennis table, a snooker table and a bar.

The Hill Pub occupies a prominent position at the south-east corner of Mount Pleasant Square.  It is best described as a handsome pub from the outside.

Mount Pleasant LTC 

The square is home to one of Dublin's leading racquet sports clubs, and the only club in the city with tennis, squash and badminton sections (and table tennis too). Mount Pleasant L.T.C. was founded in 1893, making it amongst the oldest clubs in Dublin.

The club holds a variety of tournaments, including Tennis Open Week, one of the largest tournaments in Ireland. Mount Pleasant is among the premier badminton clubs in Leinster. Membership stands at around 1,000 with about 700 tennis members and the rest more or less equally divided between squash and badminton.

Mount Pleasant Square in media 

The cover of John McGahern's novel, The Pornographer, features the curved north terrace of Mount Pleasant Square. 

The TV series Miss Scarlet and The Duke features some of the houses of the square.

References 

Susan Roundtree, The Georgian Squares of Dublin

Squares in Dublin (city)
Ranelagh
Rathmines
Georgian architecture in Ireland